The member states of the European Union are aligned in their foreign policy on many issues. The EU is the world's largest economic union, customs union and donor of humanitarian and development assistance and thus has an extensive network of delegations around the world mainly operating in the framework of External Relations, for which the European Commission is the main decision body. The EU also represents shared political and security viewpoints held by its member states, as articulated in the Common Foreign and Security Policy.

The EU's predecessor, the European Coal and Steel Community, opened its first mission in London in 1955, after three years non-EU countries began to accredit their missions in Brussels to the Community. The US had been a fervent supporter of the ECSC's efforts from the beginning, and Secretary of State Dean Acheson sent Jean Monnet a dispatch in the name of President Truman confirming full US diplomatic recognition of the ECSC. A US ambassador to the ECSC was accredited soon thereafter, and he headed the second overseas mission to establish diplomatic relations with the Community institutions.

The number of delegates began to rise in the 1960s following the merging of the executive institutions of the three European Communities into a single Commission. Until recently some states had reservations accepting that EU delegations held the full status of a diplomatic mission. Article 20 of the Maastricht Treaty requires the Delegations and the Member States' diplomatic missions to "co-operate in ensuring that the common positions and joint actions adopted by the Council are complied with and implemented".

Management of the EU External Relations is conducted by the European External Action Service which reports to the High Representative for Foreign Affairs. Delegates are generally sent only to capital cities and cities hosting multilateral bodies.

The EU missions work separately from the work of the missions of its member states, however in some circumstances it may share resources and facilities. In Abuja, the EU mission shares its premises with a number of member states. The European Commission also maintains representation in each of the member states. For details on diplomatic representation, see Foreign relations of the European Union#Diplomatic representation.

Europe

 Tirana (Delegation)

 Yerevan (Delegation )

 Baku (Delegation)

 Minsk (Delegation)

 Sarajevo (Delegation)

 Tbilisi (Delegation )

 Reykjavík (Delegation)

 Pristina (European Commission Liaison Office)
 Mitrovica (Office)

 Chișinău (Delegation )

 Podgorica (Delegation)

 Lefkoşa (Programme Support Office, EUPSO)

 Skopje (Delegation )

 Oslo (Delegation )

 Moscow (Delegation)

 Belgrade (Delegation )

 Berne (Delegation )

 Ankara (Delegation)

 Kyiv (Delegation )
 
 London (Delegation)

Africa

 Algiers (Delegation)

 Luanda (Delegation )

 Cotonou (Delegation)

 Gaborone (Delegation )

 Ouagadougou (Delegation )

 Bujumbura (Delegation )

 Yaoundé (Delegation )

 Praia (Delegation )

 Bangui (Delegation )

 N'Djamena (Delegation )

 Moroni (Delegation )

 Brazzaville (Delegation)

 Kinshasa (Delegation)

 Djibouti (Delegation )

 Cairo (Delegation)

 Asmara (Delegation )

 Mbabane (Delegation)

 Addis Ababa (Delegation )

 Libreville (Delegation)

 Banjul (Delegation)

 Accra (Delegation )

 Conakry (Delegation)

 Bissau (Delegation )

 Abidjan (Delegation )

 Nairobi (Delegation )

 Maseru (Delegation )

 Monrovia (Delegation )

 Tripoli (Delegation)

 Antananarivo (Delegation )

 Lilongwe (Delegation )

 Bamako (Delegation)

 Nouakchott (Delegation)

 Port Louis (Delegation )

 Rabat (Delegation)

 Maputo (Delegation )

 Windhoek (Delegation)

 Niamey (Delegation )

 Abuja (Delegation )

 Kigali (Delegation )

 Dakar (Delegation )

 Freetown (Delegation )

 Mogadishu (Delegation )

 Pretoria (Delegation )

 Juba (Delegation )

 Khartoum (Delegation )

 Dar es Salaam (Delegation )

 Lomé (Delegation )

 Tunis (Delegation)

 Kampala (Delegation )

 Lusaka (Delegation)

 Harare (Delegation )

Asia

 Kabul (Delegation )

 Dhaka (Delegation) 

Phnom Penh (Delegation )

 Beijing (Delegation )

 Hong Kong (Office )

 Macau (Office )

 Dili (Delegation )

 New Delhi (Delegation )

 Jakarta (Delegation ) 

 Baghdad (Delegation)

 Tel Aviv (Delegation)

 Tokyo (Delegation)

 Amman (Delegation)

 Astana (Delegation)
 Almaty (Office)

 Kuwait City (Delegation)

 Bishkek (Delegation)

 Vientiane (Delegation)

 Beirut (Delegation)

 Kuala Lumpur (Delegation)

 Ulaanbaatar (Delegation)

 Yangon (Delegation)

 Kathmandu (Delegation)

 Islamabad (Delegation)

 East Jerusalem (European Commission Technical Assistance Office)

 Manila (Delegation )

 Doha (Delegation)

 Riyadh (Delegation)

 Singapore (Delegation)

 Seoul (Delegation)

 Colombo (Delegation)

 Taipei (European Economic and Trade Office)

 Dushanbe (Delegation)

 Bangkok (Delegation )

 Ashgabat (Delegation)

 Abu Dhabi (Delegation)
 Dubai (Delegation)

 Tashkent (Europa House)

 Hanoi (Delegation )

North America

 Bridgetown (Delegation)

 Belmopan (Delegation)

 Ottawa (Delegation)

 San Jose (Delegation)

 Havana (Delegation)

 Santo Domingo (Delegation)

 San Salvador (Delegation)

 Ciudad de Guatemala (Delegation)

 Port-au-Prince (Delegation)

 Tegucigalpa (Delegation)

 Kingston (Delegation)

 Mexico City (Delegation)

 Managua (Delegation)

 Panama City (Delegation)

 Port of Spain (Delegation)
 
 Washington, D.C. (Delegation)
 San Francisco (Office)

Oceania

 Canberra (Delegation )
 Sydney (Delegation )
 Melbourne (Delegation )
 Brisbane (Delegation )
 Perth (Delegation )
 Darwin (Delegation )

 Suva (Delegation )

 Wellington (Delegation )
 Auckland (Delegation )

 Port Moresby (Delegation )

 Apia (Delegation )

 Honiara (Delegation )

 Port Villa (Delegation )

South America

 Buenos Aires (Delegation)

 La Paz (Delegation)

 Brasília (Delegation)

 Santiago (Delegation)

 Bogotá (Delegation)

 Quito (Delegation)

 Georgetown (Delegation)

 Asunción (Delegation)

 Lima (Delegation)

 Montevideo (Delegation)

 Caracas (Delegation)

Non-resident Delegation
Resident in Bridgetown, Barbados

Resident in Suva, Fiji

Missions to open

Former Missions

Countries without formal diplomatic missions to the EU

Multilateral organisations
 Addis Ababa (Delegation to the African Union)
 Geneva (Delegation to UN organisations and the World Trade Organization)
 Jakarta (Delegation to ASEAN)
 New York City (Delegation to the United Nations)
 Paris (Delegation to UNESCO and the Organisation for Economic Co-operation and Development)
 Rome (Delegation to the Holy See, Order of Malta, San Marino and UN organisations: Food and Agriculture Organization, WFP, IFAD)
 Strasbourg (Delegation to the Council of Europe)
 Vienna (Delegation to the international organisations in Vienna: IAEA, UNODC, UNIDO and the Organization for Security and Co-operation in Europe)

Notes

See also
 Accreditations and Responsibilities of EU delegations – for non-resident missions
 Delegations of the European Parliament
 Delegation of the European Union to Canada

 European Union Delegation to the United Kingdom
 Delegation of the European Union to the United Nations
 Delegation of the European Union to the United States
 European External Action Service
 Foreign relations of the European Union
 List of diplomatic missions to the European Union
 List of European Union ambassadors
 CARIFORUM

References

External links
 EU Delegations worldwide
 External Relations Directorate of the European Commission
 External Service Directory – accreditations and responsibilities

Diplomatic missions
European Union